The Sint Maarten Christian Party (abbreviated: SMCP ) is a political party on Sint Maarten with a Christian Democratic signature.

History 
The party was founded by Wycliffe Smith and J. Edwin Arrindell on 4 November 2015. They published a draft manifesto on 22 March 2016.

Electoral results

References 

Christian political parties
Christian democratic parties in North America
Political parties established in 2014
2014 establishments in Sint Maarten
Political parties in Sint Maarten